The Colony and Protectorate of Kenya competed in the Summer Olympic Games for the first time at the 1956 Summer Olympics in Melbourne, Australia. 25 competitors, 24 men and 1 woman, took part in 10 events in 4 sports.

Athletics

Men's 5000 metres
Nyandika Maiyoro (→7th place)

Men's Marathon 
Arap Sum Kanuti — 2:58:42 (→ 31st place)

High Jump
Joseph Leresae (→18th place)

Hockey

The following players represented Kenya:

 Roland Frank
 Anthony Vaz
 Balbir Singh Sidhu
 Peter Dalgado
 Surjeet Singh Deol
 Tejinder Singh Rao
 Gursaran Singh Sehmi
 Tejparkash Singh Brar
 Reynold D'Souza
 Hardev Singh Kular
 Alu Mendonca
 Michael Pereira
 Bill Plenderleith
 Dudley Coulson

Shooting

Two shooters represented Kenya in 1956.

50 m rifle, three positions
 Roy Congreve
 Charles Trotter

50 m rifle, prone
 Roy Congreve
 Charles Trotter

Swimming

References

External links
Official Olympic Reports

Nations at the 1956 Summer Olympics
1956
1956 in Kenyan sport
1956 Summer Olympics